Bondo is a town in north-eastern Ivory Coast. It is a sub-prefecture of Bondoukou Department in Gontougo Region, Zanzan District.

Bondo was a commune until March 2012, when it became one of 1126 communes nationwide that were abolished.

In 2014, the population of the sub-prefecture of Bondo was 19,932.

Villages
The sixteen villages of the sub-prefecture of Bondo and their population in 2014 are:

Notes

Sub-prefectures of Gontougo
Former communes of Ivory Coast